Theophilus was the 23rd Pope of Alexandria and Patriarch of the Seat of Saint Mark. He became pope at a time of conflict between the newly dominant Christians and the pagan establishment in Alexandria, each of which was supported by a segment of the Alexandrian populace.

Background
In 391, Theophilus (according to Rufinus and Sozomen) discovered a hidden pagan temple. He and his followers mockingly displayed the pagan artifacts to the public which offended the pagans enough to provoke an attack on the Christians. The Christian faction counter-attacked, forcing the pagans to retreat to the Serapeum. A letter was sent by the emperor that Theophilus should grant the offending pagans pardon, but destroy the temple; according to Socrates Scholasticus, a contemporary of his, the latter aspect (the destruction of the temple) was added as a result of heavy solicitation for it by Theophilus.

Scholasticus goes on to state that:

The destruction of the Serapeum was seen by many ancient and modern authors as representative of the triumph of Christianity over other religions. According to John of Nikiu in the 7th century, when the philosopher Hypatia was lynched and flayed by an Alexandrian mob, they acclaimed Theophilus's nephew and successor Cyril as "the new Theophilus, for he had destroyed the last remains of idolatry in the city".

Theophilus turned on the followers of Origen after having supported them for a time. He switched his view of God from the incorporeal view of God held by Origen to the anthropomorphic view held by many local monks who were hostile to his pastoral letter of 399.

He was accompanied by his nephew Cyril to Constantinople in 403 and there presided at the "Synod of the Oak" that deposed John Chrysostom.

On 10 July in the Eastern (Greek) Orthodox Synaxarion, there is a commemoration for the 10,000 monks slain on the orders of Pope Theophilus in his paranoid campaign against perceived Origenism and the Four Tall Brethren. His nephew and dynastic successor Cyril was canonized in both Eastern and Western Christendom, with the notable exception of the Assyrian Church of the East, for his articulation and defense of the hypostatic union, his central role at the First Council of Ephesus, and his opposition to Patriarch Nestorius of Constantinople.

Surviving works
 Correspondence with Jerome, Pope Anastasius I and Pope Innocent I
 Tract against Chrysostom
 Homily on the Crucifixion and the Good Thief
 Homilies translated by Jerome (preserved in Migne)
 Other homilies survive only in Coptic and Ge'ez translations.

Theophilus’ Paschal table
Theophilus obliged the pious Christian emperor Theodosius I (AD 379–395) to himself by dedicating his Paschal table to him (around AD 390). Theophilus’ Paschal table did not survive, but what we do  know is that the Metonic 19-year lunar cycle underlying it must have been very different from the very first similar lunar cycle which somewhere in the third quarter of the third century was invented by Anatolius but differed very little from the classical Alexandrian 19-year lunar cycle, which in the fifth century would be introduced by Annianus and adopted by Theophilus’ successor Cyrillus and whose Julian equivalent would become the Metonic basic structure of Dionysius Exiguus’ Paschal table. Bede's Paschal table is an exact extension of Dionysius Exiguus' one.

In popular culture
Theophilus appears in the novel Flow Down Like Silver, Hypatia of Alexandria by Ki Longfellow.

He appears as a character played by Manuel Cauchi in the 2009 film Agora, directed by Alejandro Amenábar.

Legacy
The lunar crater Theophilus was named after him, as part of a group of three lunar craters named after prominent Alexandrian Christians.

Pope Theophilus is venerated as a saint only within the Coptic Church of Alexandria; his sainthood is not recognized by the Eastern Orthodox, Roman Catholic, or Assyrian Churches.

References

Literature 
 Georges Declercq (2000) Anno Domini (The Origins of the Christian Era): Turnhout
 John N.D. Kelly (1998) Golden Mouth: New York (Cornell University Press)
 Alden A. Mosshammer (2008) The Easter Computus and the Origins of the Christian Era: Oxford
 Norman Russell (2006) Theophilus of Alexandria: London, Routledge (The Early Church Fathers)
 Jan Zuidhoek (2017) “The initial year of De ratione paschali and the relevance of its paschal dates”, Studia Traditionis Theologiae 26: 71-93

Further reading
 
 Polański, T., "The Three Young Men in the Furnace and the Art of Ecphrasis in the Coptic Sermon by Theophilus of Alexandria," Studies in Ancient Art and Civilisation, 10 (2007), 79–100.

External links

 Christian Classics Ethereal Library: Theophilus
 Bede's Library: Theophilus
 Order of the Magnificat: St. Cyril
 Cyril of Alexandria
 Nestorian Theology
 John of Nikiu, Chronicle: the lynching of Hypatia
 Socrates and Sozumenos Ecclesiastical Histories ch. vii
 Five Metonic 19-year lunar cycles

412 deaths
Saints from Roman Egypt
Serapis
Persecution of pagans in the late Roman Empire
4th-century Popes and Patriarchs of Alexandria
5th-century Popes and Patriarchs of Alexandria
5th-century Christian saints
Year of birth unknown